Mater Dei School (abbreviated MD;) is a private Catholic School run by the Sisters of the Ursuline Order who founded the school in 1928. "Mater Dei" is a Latin phrase meaning "Mother of God".

History 
In 1925, the Ursuline Sisters of the Roman Union sent four European Sisters to carry out educational works in Thailand at the invitation of Archbishop Rene Perros, Head of the Catholic Mission in Siam. In 1926, Sister Marie Bernard Mancel, the second superior of the Ursuline Order in Thailand decided to purchase a piece of land of about 18 rai (just under 3 hectares) with a large house. Mater Dei School was therefore set up and was the only educational institution on Ploenchit Road. Its wooden building had two prominent towers, one housing boarding students while another was the residence of the Sisters with a small chapel located inside.

In 1927, the Sisters built a new two-story school with constructed entirely of teak wood. It was separated by a clean and crystal clear pond from the old building. Classrooms were set up based on the British system, enrolling students from Kindergarten to Form V and comprising two departments, the English and the French departments. The school accepted both day and boarding students and was considered to be the first school to offer Kindergarten level.

The official day Mater Dei was founded is February 2, 1928. Classes commenced on February 6, 1928 with 45 students. Initially, two Sisters were assigned to accompany the students to and from Rajprasong since the area was rather deserted.

Although Mater Dei was an all-girls school, it enrolled boys from Kindergarten to Primary 2 as well. One of those students was Prince Ananda Mahidol who enrolled in 1930 and was given 273 as his student ID number. He became the king of  Thailand in 1935, and remained so until his mysterious death in 1946. He was succeeded as King by his brother, Prince Bhumibol Adulyadej, who joined the school in 1932 and was given 449 as his student ID number.

In 1936, Mater Dei changed its curriculum to conform to that of the Ministry of Education. The Ministry opened a Pre-University School in order to prepare students for university education. It ordered other schools to discontinue classes for the last two years in the Secondary level, thus reducing the number of years for Secondary education. Mater Dei, therefore, opened a Finishing Course in 1939 that required three years to complete. In pursuing this course, students learned about proper etiquette so they would grow up to be well-rounded adults. No emphasis was placed on vocational training, but students were taught both domestic science and job skills. This course was later discontinued.

In 1944, during World War II, following the advice of the Ministry of Education, the school evacuated students to a safe shelter, its newly opened school in Hua Hin, Prachuab Khirikhan Province. It was moved back to the original location in 1945 when the war was over and the Japanese occupiers had left.

Due to the constant increase in the number of students and the poor condition of the old buildings that made teaching difficult, the Sisters decided to build a new 3-storey building in 1960. Situated to the west and parallel to Lang Suan Road, the building had eleven classrooms and three activity rooms. In 1962, another building comprising eight classrooms was built and the old wooden building was demolished.

In 1964, Mater Dei received the "Outstanding School" Award and the same award was given to the school for three consecutive years. On the 3rd year, it also received a royal plaque.

Facilities 
In 1969, with the old auditorium being in disrepair, a new one was built in its place- the upper floor housing the auditorium and the lower floor housing the dining hall. To commemorate the 50th anniversary of the founding of Mater Dei School, the "50th Memorial Building" was opened in 1981. It is currently the school's gymnasium.

The most recent building was constructed in 1992. It houses the Kindergarten and Secondary School. Its name, "Royal Celebration Building", was given by King Bhumibol to celebrate his 6th cycle (72nd) birthday. It was also to commemorate the founding of the school 72 years before.

All along, the school has been given excellent support from the "Mater Dei School Alumni Association Under the Royal Patronage" and the "Parents and Teachers Association" in the areas of human resource development, education, as well as the construction of new buildings to accommodate and provide quality education.

Curriculum 
At present, the school accepts students from Kindergarten 3 to the final year of Secondary School. In general, the number of students in each class is limited to forty eight, except for Kindergarten where there are thirty students in each class. There are four rooms for Kindergarten and three each for Primary and Lower Secondary. As for Upper Secondary, students have a choice of three curriculum: Science, Art and Science, or Art and Language in which students choose to learn French.

Mater Dei's motto is "Serviam - We Shall Serve" in line with the school's philosophy which is to "Educate the students so they become quality persons with high moral standards possessing wisdom and inner stability, and nurture them until they become well-rounded persons."

Notable alumni
 Ananda Mahidol, King Rama VIII of Thailand
 Bhumibol Adulyadej, King Rama IX of Thailand
 Dasanavalaya Sorasongkram, niece of King Rama IX

References

Schools in Bangkok
Girls' schools in Thailand
Catholic schools in Thailand
Pathum Wan district